The 2008–09 State League Twenty20 was the second season of the women's Twenty20 cricket competition played in New Zealand. It ran from December 2008 to January 2009, with 6 provincial teams taking part. Wellington Blaze beat Canterbury Magicians in the final to win the tournament, their first Twenty20 title.

The tournament ran alongside the 2008–09 State League.

Competition format 
Teams played in a round-robin in a group of six, playing 5 matches overall. Matches were played using a Twenty20 format. The top two in the group advanced to the final.

The group worked on a points system with positions being based on the total points. Points were awarded as follows:

Win: 4 points 
Tie: 2 points 
Loss: 0 points.
Abandoned/No Result: 2 points.

Points table

Source: ESPN Cricinfo

 Advanced to the Final

Final

Statistics

Most runs

Source: ESPN Cricinfo

Most wickets

Source: ESPN Cricinfo

References

External links
 Series home at ESPN Cricinfo

Super Smash (cricket)
2008–09 New Zealand cricket season
State League Twenty20